Odyssey of the Mind, abbreviated OM or OotM, is a creative problem-solving program where team members present their solution at a competition to a predefined long-term problem that takes many months to complete and involves writing, design, construction, and theatrical performance. A spontaneous portion of the competition has the team also generate solutions to a problem they have not seen before.

Odyssey of the Mind is a trademark of Creative Competitions, Inc. (CCI).  Competitions are administered by a mixture of regional non-profit associations and the for-profit CCI corporation.

History 

The Odyssey of the Mind program was co-founded by C. Samuel Micklus and Theodore Gourley in 1978 at Glassboro State College (now Rowan University) in Glassboro, New Jersey. The first competition, known as "Olympics of the Mind", involved teams from 28 New Jersey schools. The program is now international, with teams from Argentina, Australia, Belarus, Canada, China, Czech Republic, DODDS, Germany, Greece, Hong Kong, Hungary, India, Indonesia, Japan, Kazakhstan, Lithuania, Mexico, Moldova, Poland, Russia, Singapore, Slovakia, South Korea, Switzerland, Togo, the United Kingdom, and Uzbekistan, regularly competing in addition to teams from the United States.

Organization 
Odyssey of the Mind teams are divided into four divisions:
Division I — Grades 3–5 (U.S.): Less than 12 years of age on May 1 of the competition year (Other International).
Division II — Grades 6–8 (U.S.): Less than 15 years of age on May 1 of the competition year (Other International).
Division III — Grades 9–12 (U.S.): Oldest team member does not qualify for Divisions I or II and is attending regular school—not a college or university or anything similar (Other International).
Division IV — Collegiate for all teams. All team members must have a high school diploma or its equivalent and be enrolled in at least one course at a two- or four-year college or university.

The oldest team member determines the team's division.

There is also a non-competitive primary division for young children (grades K–2 U.S.), who are given a simplified problem and fewer constraints than the higher divisions. They present and are given feedback at the first level tournament and cannot advance, except for special occasions where officials invite a team to perform again at the state level.

Teams are limited to a maximum of seven team members.

In the United States, each participating state has its own Odyssey association. Most states are further broken down into regions. Teams compete at the regional level first. The highest-scoring teams progress to the state level. In the U.S. there is no national level. State-winning teams go directly to the World Finals, which have always been held in the U.S., usually at the end of May.

Event structure

Long-term problems
There are five categories of problems that participants can solve:
Vehicle: building vehicles of different sizes to perform specified tasks.
Technical: building “innovative contraptions”.
Classics: incorporates knowledge of architecture, art, and literature; can be a documentary or behind-the-scenes feature.
Structure: designing and building a structure using only balsa wood and glue to support the highest weight load 
Performance: acting, singing, and/or dancing based on a given theme

In addition to its main category, a problem may involve techniques from other categories. For example, acting is prevalent in solutions to all five problems, and a team can usually earn bonus points by throwing in knowledge of history into a non-Classics problem or technology in a non-Tech problem.

Specifications differ between problems, but there are some crucial rules. The Outside Assistance rule heavily stresses that every aspect of a solution must result from the work of the team; parents and coaches must restrict themselves to supervising safety and encouraging focus. Something as simple as a mother adjusting her child's hat prior to competition is considered outside assistance, with a score penalty. Thus all brainstorming, building, painting, sewing, and fixing are to be done by the team.

For each long-term problem, the team must present its solution in eight minutes or less, including set-up time, and the total cost of all materials used must either be under the specified Cost Limit of $125 or $145. The rules require participants to push their thinking capacities to make best use of their skills, time, and money.

A new problem for each category is presented every year on the official Odyssey of the Mind website. Most years, one problem is sponsored by NASA.

Cost limit 
There is a cost limit on the value of all materials used in the presentation of the long-term solution. This limit is typically US$125–145, where the classical, performance, and primary problems have a limit of $125, while the vehicle, technical, and structural problems have a limit of $145. As of the 2006–2007 rules update, some materials have a set assigned value. Some examples include computers and most audio-visual equipment (projectors, radios, televisions, music players, etc.). The suggested cost to write these items down as is anywhere between $5–$10. Still other materials are simply exempt from cost. This includes batteries and power cords, footwear, tables and chairs. All of these materials, even the exempt ones, must be listed on the cost form. The judges check this list to make sure that the team is within the cost limit and following the appropriate assigned values and exemptions.

Style 
Style is a component of long-term problems where teams are scored on specific elements of their presentation. There are five elements scored in style. Often, two of these elements are specified in the problem, the other two are then "free choice of team" elements, and the fifth is a score of how well the other elements contribute to the performance overall. The pre-specified elements are related to the problem in some way; they are typically something to do with the appearance of a vehicle, costume, or prop. The free choice items may be anything the team wishes as long as they are not already scored as part of the long-term solution or pre-specified elements. Each element is scored from 1–10,bruhhe overall score.

Spontaneous
As the name suggests, teams do not know ahead of time the topic they are to compete in. At the tournament, individual teams enter the competition room and are presented with one of three problem types: verbal, hands-on, or verbal/hands-on.

In verbal problems, teams are usually given a minute to think and then two to three minutes to respond to a theme such as "make a rhyme using a name or species of an animal". Teams will then be graded based on the creativity of their individual responses. For instance, "there is a dog on a log" is a common answer which would earn the team one point, while "I can step on an ant, but an uncle I can't" involves word play, a creative response that is worth 3 or 5 points. Verbal problems encourage individuals to incorporate their knowledge of history, science, literature, and popular culture.

Hands-on problems focus on teamwork and the ability to listen to complicated directions. Teams will usually be instructed to build something based on the limited materials given, such as a freestanding tower using a few sheets of paper, some paper clips, a pair of scissors, and a piece of tape. The team with the tallest tower and the best teamwork earns the most points. In OM, if the rules do not say that something cannot be done, then it can; in other words, participants are encouraged to search for creative, outside-the-box solutions.

A hybrid, or verbal/hands-on, problem has aspects of both types, typically either a verbal problem that involves manipulation of physical objects or a two-part problem: build something in part 1, and provide verbal responses with it in part 2.

Teams are allowed up to seven team members in total, but only five may compete in the spontaneous category at the tournament. The others may watch the competition, but may not help. Before the competition the team should decide who is on the verbal, hands-on, and verbal/hands-on subteams, so they can quickly assemble soon after entering the competition room and learning the problem type.

Scoring 
Each team is given a score out of 350 points: 200 from Long-term, 100 from Spontaneous, and 50 from Style. Style is scored from 1–10 in each of the five categories, and the Long-term and Spontaneous problems are scored according to each problem's individual rules. The scores awarded are then scaled within each problem and division based upon the highest score achieved by any team in each of the three scoring categories. For instance, the team scoring highest in Long-term in a particular problem and division receives 200 points, and the scores for the other teams in that problem and division are scaled proportionately. A team ranking first in its problem and division in all three elements of the competition would thus receive a "perfect" score of 350 points, regardless of the actual raw scores assigned by the judges.

The Ranatra Fusca Creativity Award is granted to teams who have demonstrated exceptional creativity, the essence of the Odyssey of the Mind program. Winning the award at the regional or state level will qualify a team to advance to the next level of competition, even if the team had not placed high enough to advance on their own.

World Finals 
All teams who advance from their state finals, or their national finals if they are from outside of the US, are invited to World Finals. World Finals is the culmination of the entire year of Odyssey of the Mind.

 2021 - Orange County Convention Center in Orlando, Florida, June 11–13
 2020 – Held virtually because of the COVID-19 pandemic

A variety of non-competitive activities are provided at World Finals; the representative one is pin trading, in which participants trade pins from their regions and states with participants from other states and countries. There is a creativity festival where each state/country runs a booth containing a fun activity related to their state. The highlights of World Finals are the opening and closing ceremonies. These ceremonies are held Olympics-style in a stadium on campus. Teams march in and sit with other competitors from their state. After the closing ceremonies, several parties are held for different age groups and a party is held for the coaches. These parties are a reward for all the hard work that teams have put in.

The float and banner parade is another fun event that happens on the Thursday night of the World Finals. It is a parade in which every state and country participating makes a float and/or a banner to represent their state.

The coaches' competition is another event that is put on during World Finals. The competition is only for coaches and is more along the lines of a spontaneous problem than a long-term problem. The coaches get the problem in advance and have time to prepare. They hand out awards to the first, second, and third place coaches.

References

External links 
 
 COU — Creative Opportunities Unlimited

Educational organizations based in the United States
Student competitions